was the fourth of ten s built for the Imperial Japanese Navy under the "Circle One" Program (Maru Ichi Keikaku).

Design Background
Despite being one of the most powerful classes of destroyers in the world at the time of their completion, none survived the Pacific War.
Yūdachi, built at the Sasebo Naval Arsenal was laid down on 16 October 1934, launched on 21 June 1936 and commissioned on 7 January 1937.

Operational history
From January 1942, Yūdachi participated in operations in the Netherlands East Indies, including the invasions of Tarakan, Balikpapan and eastern Java. During the Battle of the Java Sea, Yūdachi engaged a group of Allied destroyers and cruisers. Returning to Subic Bay in the Philippines on 16 March, Yūdachi assisted in the blockade of Manila Bay and the invasion of Cebu, returning to Yokosuka for repairs in early May. During the Battle of Midway on 4–6 June, Yūdachi was part of the Midway Occupation Force under the overall command of Admiral Nobutake Kondō.

From mid-June, Yūdachi deployed from Kure via Singapore and Mergui for raiding operations in the Indian Ocean, but the operation was cancelled due to reverses suffered by the Imperial Japanese Navy in the Solomon Islands. Yūdachi arrived at Shortland Island on 30 August, and was immediately assigned to "Tokyo Express" high speed transport runs to Guadalcanal. Yūdachi continued making missions to Guadalcanal through November, participating briefly in the Battle of the Santa Cruz Islands on 26 October under Admiral Takeo Kurita.

On the night of 12–13 November 1942, in the First Naval Battle of Guadalcanal, Yūdachi escorted the Bombardment Force of Rear Admiral Abe Hiroaki. The lead ship in the formation at beginning of battle, Yūdachi had to swerve to avoid U.S. ships, then torpedoed the cruiser . Yūdachi then mistook the destroyer  for a friendly ship and flashed its recognition signals. Sterett fired back, hitting Yūdachis #1 boiler room, leaving the ship dead in the water. After Yūdachi was disabled, 207 survivors were removed by Samidare, which then failed to scuttle her with three torpedoes. The abandoned hulk was later sunk by gunfire of Portland, southeast of Savo Island at position. According to James Hornfischer, Yūdachi was showing a white flag before Portland fired, but this was deliberately ignored by the American captain, who directed his gunnery officer to "sink the S.O.B.".

Notes

References

 OCLC 77257764

External links

Shiratsuyu-class destroyers
World War II destroyers of Japan
Shipwrecks in the Solomon Sea
Ships built by Sasebo Naval Arsenal
1936 ships
World War II shipwrecks in the Pacific Ocean
Maritime incidents in November 1942
Shipwrecks in Ironbottom Sound